Moonflower Plastic (Welcome to My Wigwam) is the second studio album by the rock artist Tobin Sprout, member of the band Guided by Voices. It was released in 1997 on Matador. Fellow GBV bandmate Kevin Fennell helped with the drumming on this release.

Reception 
It is considered his best album on AllMusic ("album pick") and earned a very positive 4.5/5 stars from the review of Stephen Thomas Erlewine.

Track listing 
 Get Out of My Throat - 4.01
 Moonflower Plastic (You're Here) - 2.18
 Paper Cut - 3.00
 Beast of Souls - 3.27
 A Little Odd - 0.40
 Angels Hang Their Socks on the Moon - 4.35
 All Used Up - 2.00
 Since I... - 3.08
 Back Chorus - 0.37
 Curious Things - 2.42
 Exit Planes - 3.21
 Little Bit of Dread - 2.13
 Hit Junky Dives - 4.16
 Water on the Boater's Back - 2.02

Personnel 

 Tobin Sprout - Vocals, bass, composer, drums, guitar, keyboards, organ, piano

Other/Production 

 Kevin Fennell - Drums
 John Peterson - Drums 
 Joe Buben - Drums
 Billy Mason - Drums
 Gary King - Engineer, mixing
 John Shough - Engineer, mixing

References

1997 albums
Tobin Sprout albums
Matador Records albums